The Fubon Xinyi A25 is an under-construction skyscraper located in Xinyi Special District, Xinyi District, Taipei, Taiwan. It will be the sixth-tallest building in Taiwan and the fourth-tallest in Xinyi Special District. It will be completed at the end of 2021 and the headquarter of Fubon Financial Holding Co.

Design 
To the east of the Tower, the 3-floor high Fubon Museum includes over 2,000m2 of contemporary and modern art galleries. More than 150 trees will be planted in the landscaped garden, offering the public a shaded environment in a sub-tropical climate. North of the site, a park will be created to give the surrounding residential area a neighborhood park.

The floor plate with floor to floor heights of  allows good layouts for the offices, with a depth ratio that ensures quality daylighting levels in the office work place.

The square shape with cut-back notch corners employs an efficient steel structure. Perimeter bracing combined with a secondary moment frame structure provides a robust and efficient structural system to resist lateral seismic and typhoon wind loads.

The façades will be made of low-iron extra white glass with a neutral colored solar control coating to give the tower a crystalline appearance. The façade cavity system will include cavity blinds and will ensure good solar control, daylight levels and thermal comfort and performance. The project is committed to obtain the Taiwanese Green Building Certification (EEWH), with the objective of achieving the Gold level.

Gallery

See also 
 List of tallest buildings in Taiwan
 List of tallest buildings in Taipei
 Taipei 101
 Shin Kong Life Tower
 Taipei Sky Tower

References 

Buildings and structures under construction in Taiwan
Skyscraper office buildings in Taipei
Xinyi Special District
Renzo Piano buildings
Office buildings completed in 2022